HMS Marlborough is a Duke-class Type 23 frigate formerly in service with the Royal Navy, and the sixth ship to bear the name. She was named after John Churchill, 1st Duke of Marlborough. The ship entered service with the Royal Navy in 1991 and served in the Middle East. The frigate was taken out of service in 2005 and sold to Chile. The vessel entered service with the Chilean Navy in 2008 as Almirante Condell. The ship was significantly upgraded from 2020 to 2021 and remains in service.

Service history

Royal Navy
Marlborough was a Duke-class Type 23 frigate and carried pennant number F233 rather than the sequential number of F232 which was considered unlucky, Form S.232 being the formal notification of a grounding or collision. The course 232 is also traditionally not given for the same reason, with a course heading of half degree either side of 232 being the alternative.

Marlborough was the first naval ship on the scene to assist the stricken USS Cole after she was attacked in Aden, Yemen in October 2000. Marlborough, under the command of Captain Anthony Rix, was on passage to the UK after a six-month deployment in the Gulf and had a full medical detachment on board. When her offer of assistance was accepted, she immediately diverted to Aden.

On 27 October 2001, the ship's Lynx helicopter crashed into the Arabian Sea after an Omani warship collided with the aircraft as it was hovering above the water. The pilot and observer suffered minor injuries and were taken onboard the aircraft carrier HMS Illustrious. The incident happened during exercise ‘Saif Sareea’ (Swift Sword) a joint exercise between British and Omani forces. The Lynx was dropping a dummy torpedo into the sea when an Omani vessel sailed into it from behind, catching the helicopter's rotor blades on its rigging.

Marlborough played a key role in the second Gulf War, under the command of Captain Mark Anderson.

In July 2004, it was announced that Marlborough would be one of three Type 23 ships to be decommissioned by the end of 2006. In October 2004 Marlborough again came to the aid of a stricken ally when she was dispatched to assist the submarine , adrift off the northwest Irish coast and arrived at the scene where  and Marlboroughs sister-ship HMS  were present. Montrose had been the first ship to make contact with the boat. Other ships were also dispatched, including .

Prior to her decommissioning, Marlborough had a US Navy officer permanently assigned to her crew. Reciprocally, a Royal Navy officer was permanently assigned to the destroyer .

Transfer to Chile
The 2003 defence cuts committed Marlborough to pay off by March 2006. In June 2005, it was announced that Marlborough would be sold to the Chilean Navy. The Chilean Navy officially welcomed their new Almirante Condell into the fleet at a commissioning ceremony on 28 May 2008. The vessel was the last of three former Royal Navy Type 23 frigates to be handed over to Chile, under a £134 million pound sales agreement arranged by the Ministry of Defence's Disposal Services Authority and signed in September 2005. She joins her sister ships in the Chilean Navy, the former  and former , handed over in November 2006 and March 2007 respectively.

Along with other Chilean vessels of her class, Almirante Condell underwent a significant upgrade from September 2020 to October 2021. The CMS 330 combat management architecture was installed along TRS-4D G-Band active scanning radars and 32 CAMM Sea Ceptor vertical-launch surface-to-air missile silos to replace the previous Sea Wolf SAM system.

References

External links

Background on HMS Marlborough

Ships built by Swan Hunter
Ships built on the River Tyne
1989 ships
Type 23 frigates of the Royal Navy
Type 23 frigates of the Chilean Navy